The Australia A cricket team toured  England to play 5 List A matches against several County Clubs and First-class matches against Sussex and the England Lions cricket team, all played in June and July 2019.

Squads
In April 2019, Australia A announced two 14-man touring parties. Ahead of the First-class matches, Joe Burns added to the squad.

List A matches

Northamptonshire vs Australia A

Derbyshire vs Australia A

Worcestershire vs Australia A

Gloucestershire vs Australia A

Gloucestershire vs Australia A

First-class matches

Sussex vs Australia A

Unofficial Test : England Lions vs Australia A

References

External links
 Series home at ESPN Cricinfo

Australia A
Australian cricket tours of England